The Spirit Never Dies is a 2009 rock album by Falco.  The album features eight new songs as well as the final song in the Jeanny Trilogy titled "The Spirit Never Dies".

Track listing
Return to Forever - 2:08
Nuevo Afrikano - 4:57
Jeanny, Part 1 - 5:54
Coming Home (Jeanny, Part 2: Ein Jahr danach) - 5:31
The Spirit Never Dies (Jeanny Final) - 4:56
Qué Pasa Hombre (original version) - 4:41
Poison (original version) - 4:58
Sweet Symphony - 4:25
Kissing in the Kremlin - 3:53
Dada Love - 4:28
The Spirit Never Dies (Jeanny Final) The Special Mix - 5:01
Forever - 2:18

Background
The album was released posthumously in 2009 as a compilation of unpublished Falco songs. The title track, "The Spirit Never Dies (Jeanny Final)", was also released as a single and it scored in the top ten in Austria. The track was found by chance after a water-pipe burst in the archives of the recording studio Mörfelden-Walldorf that was used by Falco's producer Gunther Mende in 1987. After the closing of the archives, the tapes were sent to Mende personally, who then had a look at the material, all of which had originally been rejected by Falco's recording label Teldec; this was explained by Horst Bork in an interview mentioning that Falco had tried to use a different style of music at the time that the label did not want to support.

After digital remastering of the tape, and inclusion of New Zealand vocalist Rietta Austin, the song was edited and published under the claim that it was the official third part of the Jeanny Trilogy by the album's producers Gunther Mende and Alexander C. De Rouge.

Charts
The album was a hit in the Austrian and German music charts.

References

Falco (musician) albums
2009 albums
Albums published posthumously